The 1989 season was the Kansas City Chiefs' 20th in the National Football League, their 30th overall and their first under head coach Marty Schottenheimer and general manager Carl Peterson. They improved on their 4–11–1 record from 1988 and finished with an 8–7–1 record. The Chiefs did not qualify for the playoffs in for the third straight year but did send four players to the Pro Bowl. The Chiefs Week 11 10–10 tie against the Cleveland Browns remains the most recent tie in Chiefs history.

Background 
The Chiefs had changed coaches before, but never had the organization gone through the complete overhaul it did between the 1988 and 1989 seasons. On December 19, 1988, Lamar Hunt hired Carl Peterson as the team's new president/general manager. Peterson wasted no time in making changes. On January 5 he fired head coach Frank Gansz two weeks after taking over. On January 24 he hired Marty Schottenheimer, who was fired by Cleveland Browns owner Art Modell. Schottenheimer also cleaned house and with Peterson's help by making several roster changes, including drafting future hall of famer Derrick Thomas. Thomas later became a key part to the Chiefs defense in 90s and became one of the most popular players with fans in franchise history.

Season summary 
The Chiefs started the season at Denver on September 10 but the Chiefs lost the opener, 34–20. The very next Sunday the Chiefs downed the Los Angeles Raiders 24–19, garnering Schottenheimer's first win as Chiefs' head coach.

The Chiefs would start the season 1–4, but soon turned things around. On October 22, Christian Okoye carried the ball 33 times for 170 yards as the Chiefs defeated the Dallas Cowboys at Arrowhead Stadium, 36–28. 

On November 26, Kansas City cruised past the Houston Oilers, 34–0 to start a 3-game winning streak to give themselves a chance to make the playoffs. 

On December 17, using a bruising running game and a smothering defense, the San Diego Chargers marched into Arrowhead Stadium and crushed the Chiefs' playoffs dreams. They bulldozed their way to 219 yards rushing, 176 by Marion Butts, and won 20–13. The all but eliminated the Chiefs from any chance of making the playoffs. Chiefs' quarterback Steve DeBerg was ineffective because of the chilling 18-degree weather and completed just 14 of 33 passes. Okoye constantly found his path blocked, holes jammed. The Chiefs had one final opportunity to tie the game, driving from their own 36 yard line to the San Diego 19. DeBerg's next pass into the end zone was intercepted, ending the Chiefs' chances and the game. The loss left the Chiefs needing a win at Miami on Christmas Eve, combined with losses by Indianapolis, Pittsburgh and the Raiders that day and Cincinnati on Christmas Day to make the playoffs.

The next week, the Chiefs did bounce back and defeated the Miami Dolphins for the second time in the season, 27–24 and had a winning record in the first Peterson-Schottenheimer season at 8-7-1. The Bengals, Colts and Raiders also lost that weekend; however, the Steelers won their game and final AFC Playoff spot, finishing 9-7 overall.

DeBerg passed for 2,529 yards in his second season with the team. Okoye led the NFL in rushing with 1,480 yards. Stephone Paige led the receivers with 44 receptions. Rookie linebacker Derrick Thomas recorded 10 sacks.

Okoye was named to the Pro Bowl along with defensive stars Albert Lewis, Kevin Ross and Thomas.

Offseason

NFL draft

Personnel

Staff

Roster

Schedule

Preseason

Regular season 

Note: Intra-division opponents are in bold text.

Game summaries

Week 1: at Denver Broncos

Week 2: vs. Los Angeles Raiders

Week 3: at San Diego Chargers

Week 4: vs. Cincinnati Bengals

Week 5: at Seattle Seahawks

Week 6: at Los Angeles Raiders

Week 7: vs. Dallas Cowboys

Week 8: at Pittsburgh Steelers

Week 9: vs. Seattle Seahawks

Week 10: vs. Denver Broncos

Week 11: at Cleveland Browns

Week 12: vs. Houston Oilers

Week 13: vs. Miami Dolphins

Week 14: at Green Bay Packers

Week 15: vs. San Diego Chargers

Week 16: at Miami Dolphins

Standings

References

Kansas City Chiefs
Kansas City Chiefs seasons
Kansas